is a sports and sci-fi anime production scheduled to air on Mainichi Broadcasting System in 2009 that involves characters playing basketball while riding mecha. This new series premise was created by Thomas Romain and Shoji Kawamori, with the animation produced by Satelight. The project direction is being handled by Shoji Kawamori, while the series direction is done by Shin Itagaki.

The opening theme from episodes 2-13 was "nO limiT" by Haruka Tomatsu, Saori Hayami and Megumi Nakajima. From episodes 14-26, the opening theme was changed to "Boku ga Boku no Mama" by THE SPIN. The ending theme from episodes 1-12 was "free" by Yu Yamada. In episode 13, it was "Running On" by Haruka Tomatsu, Saori Hayami and Megumi Nakajima. From episodes 14-23 and 25-26, the ending theme was "Futari no Yakusoku" by Haruka Tomatsu, Saori Hayami and Megumi Nakajima. In episode 24, the ending theme was "Hoshiwatari" by Megumi Nakajima.

Episode list

Rolling Town arc

Road! Road! arc

Underground arc

Legend League arc

References 

Basquash!